Jacques Philippe Villeré (April 28, 1761 – March 7, 1830) was the second Governor of Louisiana after it became a state. He was the first Creole and the first native of Louisiana to hold that office.

Early life
He was born in 1761 near present-day Kenner, Louisiana, on his maternal grandfather's plantation La Providence. 

His father was Joseph Antoine de Villeré, an official in the French Navy during the reign of King Louis XV and later a colonial militia captain in the German Coast area of present-day southeast Louisiana. A few years after 1763's cession of La Louisiane to Spain, Joseph was sentenced to death by Spanish Governor Alejandro O'Reilly, who was sent by King Charles III to suppress a local revolt. Joseph Villeré mysteriously died prior to the firing squad execution of the rebels, in October 1769. Jacques Villeré's grandfather, Etienne Roy de Villeré, had accompanied Iberville on the voyage from France to the Gulf coast, late in the 17th century, during the reign of Louis XIV.

Jacques's mother was Louise Marguerite de la Chaise, daughter of Jacques de la Chaise and granddaughter, on her mother's side, of Charles Frederick d’Arensbourg.

Military service
Villeré joined the French Army and was educated for two years in France at the Crown's expense, due to his father's death at the hands of O'Reilly. In 1776, while still an adolescent, he was assigned to Saint-Domingue as a first lieutenant in the artillery. His mother's death in the 1780s brought him back to settle in Louisiana (New Spain), which became again a possession of France in 1800 and finally of the United States in 1803 through the Louisiana Purchase.

In 1814–15, he served with distinction in the (War of 1812's) Battle of New Orleans, as a major general commanding the 1st Division of the Louisiana Militia. His men stood fast, assigned to the area near Lake Borgne and Bayou Dupre, as British forces approached New Orleans by sea.

The Villeré plantation, Conseil, located downriver from the city, was overrun by the British. In fact, Villeré's son Gabriel, who had the rank of major and guarded the plantation with thirty soldiers, was surprised and captured when the British Army initially made its presence known. Maj. Villeré managed to escape and report the news to Gen. Andrew Jackson, who ordered the night attack of December 23, 1814.

The Villeré home was used as British headquarters throughout the Louisiana campaign for nearly one month. The family's property was damaged and they lost a number of slaves, who were taken aboard Royal Navy vessels and later freed.

Family, political career, & later life
In 1784, Villeré married Jeanne Henriette de Fazende, the daughter of Gabriel de Fazende, who owned a plantation seven miles (11 km) below New Orleans in present-day Saint Bernard Parish. The couple raised eight children. Jeanne Villeré died in 1826.

In 1803, Villeré secured a seat on the municipal council (the Cabildo) of New Orleans during the brief return to French colonial administration. The next year, after the Louisiana Purchase took effect, Villeré was appointed a major general in the territorial militia, a Police Juror in what in a few years would be the "county" of Orleans Parish, and a justice of the peace for the area which would soon become St. Bernard Parish.

Villeré was a member of the convention which drafted Louisiana's first state constitution.  He ran for Governor in 1812, to serve as the first governor after statehood, but was defeated in the election by William C. C. Claiborne who was elected overwhelmingly with over 70% of the vote.

Jacques Villeré was elected as the second state governor in 1816, narrowly defeating Joshua Lewis. He took office in December of that year and served through 1820, a period of prosperity and growth for the new state. His gubernatorial administration was noted for efforts to provide bankruptcy protection for debtors, the designation of death-by-dueling as a capital offense, and reduction of the level of state debt.

He retired to the family's sugar plantation in St. Bernard Parish after his term, as the law did not permit him to succeed himself in office. Villeré was brought out of retirement to run again for governor in the 1824 election, but he and Bernard de Marigny split the Creole vote and Henry Johnson was elected governor.

He was preparing to run for Governor again in the 1830 special election; but he died March 7, 1830, before the election, at the plantation Conseil after a long illness. His remains were interred at St. Louis Cemetery No. 2, in New Orleans.

See also
Charles Jacques Villeré

References

External links
 Jacques Philippe Villeré Papers at The Historic New Orleans Collection
 

1761 births
1830 deaths
Governors of Louisiana
Politicians from New Orleans
American militiamen in the War of 1812
Louisiana Creole people
American people of French descent
Louisiana Democratic-Republicans
Democratic-Republican Party state governors of the United States
American slave owners
Catholics from Louisiana
American militia generals